Geehi Hut is an alpine hut located in New South Wales, Australia. Geehi Hut is often named Nankervis Hut after Ken Nankervis and his brother built the hut for grazing and fishing in 1952.  Originally at the site there were several buildings including a shed, toilet, laundry and the main house.  However, in recent years the shed and laundry have been removed.

Geehi hut is constructed from river rocks with at least three rooms. The floor is a mix of concrete and dirt. Construction of this type is fairly unusual for Australian Alpine huts making Geehi hut a popular destination for camping and walking groups.

In 2004, the hut was rebuilt by the Kosciusko Huts Association with assistance from National Parks and Wildlife Service, day-laborers and the Caretakers, the Land Rover Club of New South Wales and the Range Rover Club of Sydney. It was officially re-opened on Sunday 3 October 2004 with members of the Nankervis family present.

The Geehi Hut area provides an excellent base to climb the historic and iconic Hannel's Spur Track up to the summit of Mount Kosciuszko. The trailhead is located about 1.4 km SSW of The Alpine Way road at the Geehi Flats Rest area. This challenging route is the overlooked 3rd route to the summit of Australia's highest mountain. (Difficult)

Access
 By Car
 Foot

Camping
Near the hut there is a large area for camping with plenty of shade next to Geehi River. Toilet and barbecue facilities are at the camp sites.and disabled access walking paths are along the river. There are picnic tables. There is fishing access to the river

References

Kosciusko Huts Association

Mountain huts in Australia